Adventure Radio is a UK-based media company based in Southend-on-Sea which operates radio stations in Essex.

Radio Essex

In February 2019, Connect Radio 106.8, Connect Radio 97.2 & 107.4 and Heart Hertfordshire were sold to Communicorp with the Connect stations to be rebranded as Smooth East Midlands once approved by Ofcom.

Radio Essex use the services of Sky News Radio.

References

External links
 Adventure to turn off the Lite article

Radio broadcasting companies of the United Kingdom
Mass media in Essex